Canadian electronic music group Dragonette have recorded songs for four studio albums, one extended play, one compilation album and several guest features. The group was founded in 2005 by Martina Sorbara, Dan Kurtz, Joel Stouffer and Simon Craig. They released a self-produced EP that same year and later signed with Mercury Records.

Dragonette released their debut studio album, Galore, in September 2007. Sorbara and Kurtz co-wrote all of its songs, and would continue to do so for their later albums. Sorbara and Kurtz collaborated with Steve Chrisanthou and Pete Prilesnik on the album's second single "Take It Like a Man", while American producer Greg Kurstin co-wrote the song "Black Limousine". The United States version of the album featured a cover version of "The Girls" (retitled "The Boys"), a song originally recorded by Scottish electronic artist Calvin Harris.

The band released their second studio album, Fixin to Thrill, in September 2009. It reached the top ten in Canada and was followed by Mixin to Thrill (2010), a remix album that contained three new songs written by Sorbara and Kurtz. In 2010, Dragonette collaborated with French DJ Martin Solveig on the single "Hello". The song reached number one in five countries and earned the band a Canadian Juno Award for Dance Recording of the Year in 2012. Three other songs performed with Solveig appeared on his fourth studio album Smash (2011). Bodyparts, the band's third studio album, was released in September 2012. Dragonette collaborated with Australian musician Felix Bloxsom on the song "Right Woman" and Sorbara and Kurtz co-wrote "Giddy Up" with producer Rene Arsenault. Their fourth studio album, Royal Blues, was released in 2016.

Songs

References

External links
List of Dragonette songs at AllMusic

Dragonette